Viktor Arkadyevich Bryzhin (Viktor Bryzgin; born 22 August 1962 in Voroshilovgrad) is a former Soviet athlete, winner of gold medal in 4 × 100 m relay at the 1988 Summer Olympics.

Career
Viktor Bryzhin trained at Dynamo in Voroshilovgrad. He made his debut in the international championships at the first World Championships, where he reached to the quarterfinal of 100 m and won a bronze as a member of Soviet 4 × 100 m relay team. At the 1986 European Championships, Bryzhin was last in the final of 100 m, but won the gold in 4 × 100 m.

At the 1987 World Championships, Bryzhin finished fifth in 100 m and was second in 4 × 100 m relay. At the Seoul Olympics, Bryzhin ran the opening leg in the Soviet 4 × 100 m relay team, which, in absence of United States won the gold medal. In 1988 he was awarded the title Honoured Master of Sports of the USSR. Bryzhin made his last appearance in the international athletics scene at the 1991 World Championships, where he finished seventh with the Soviet 4 × 100 m relay team.

His wife Olha Bryzhina (née Vladykina) was also a notable athlete, winner of two gold medals at the 1988 Olympics. Together they have two daughters Yelizaveta Bryzhina and Anastasiia Bryzgina who are also a successful track and field athletes (competing for Ukraine).

References

1962 births
Living people
Ukrainian male sprinters
Soviet male sprinters
Sportspeople from Luhansk
Honoured Masters of Sport of the USSR
Dynamo sports society athletes
Olympic athletes of the Soviet Union
Athletes (track and field) at the 1988 Summer Olympics
Olympic gold medalists for the Soviet Union
World Athletics Championships medalists
European Athletics Championships medalists
World Athletics Championships athletes for the Soviet Union
Medalists at the 1988 Summer Olympics
Olympic gold medalists in athletics (track and field)
Goodwill Games medalists in athletics
Competitors at the 1986 Goodwill Games
Competitors at the 1990 Goodwill Games